Tetragnatha geniculata, is a species of spider of the genus Tetragnatha. It is endemic to Sri Lanka.

See also
 List of Tetragnathidae species

References

Tetragnathidae
Endemic fauna of Sri Lanka
Spiders of Asia
Spiders described in 1892